Odile Barre (born 11 April 1962) is a French yacht racer who competed in the 1992 Summer Olympics.

References

External links
 
 
 

1962 births
Living people
French female sailors (sport)
Olympic sailors of France
Sailors at the 1992 Summer Olympics – 470
Mediterranean Games gold medalists for France